Tsabit is a town and commune, and capital of Tsabit District, in Adrar Province, south-central Algeria. According to the 2008 census it has a population of 14,895, up from 11,832 in 1998, with an annual growth rate of 2.4%.

Geography

The commune of Tsabit lies at an elevation of around  near a string of oases, at the southern end of the Gourara region of northern Adrar Province. The oases form a crescent shape; most of the villages are found on the eastern edge, while there are scattered palm trees to the west of the oasis. The area is surrounded by a mixture of rocky and sandy desert. The town of Kabertene lies across the N6 to the northeast of the main oases.

Climate

Tsabit has a hot desert climate (Köppen climate classification BWh), with summers among the warmest in the world, and only  of precipitation in the average year.

Transportation

Tsabit lies just to the west of the N6 national highway that leads north to Béchar and south to Adrar. It is connected to the N6 highway by two local roads.

Education

3.2% of the population has a tertiary education, and another 9.2% has completed secondary education. The overall literacy rate is 68.6%, and is 82.5% among males and 54.6% among females.

Localities
As of 1984, the commune was composed of 12 localities:

Ben Talah
Ghabet Moulay Ali
Ksabi
El Habla
El Maïz
Oujlane
Laayad
Hammad
Amor
Brinkene
Araine er Râs
Kabertene

References 

Neighbouring towns and cities

Communes of Adrar Province